For the United States Air Force use of this facility, see Duluth Air National Guard Base.
Duluth International Airport  is a city-owned public-use joint civil-military airport located five nautical miles (9 km) northwest of the central business district of Duluth, a city in Saint Louis County, Minnesota, United States. It serves the Twin Ports area, including Superior, Wisconsin. Mostly used for general aviation but also served by three airlines, it is Minnesota's third-busiest airport, behind Minneapolis–St. Paul International Airport (MSP) and Rochester International Airport.

The Minnesota Air National Guard's 148th Fighter Wing, equipped with F-16C Fighting Falcons, is based at Duluth Air National Guard Base, which is located on the grounds of the airport. Aircraft manufacturing company Cirrus is also based on the airport grounds, where it has its main manufacturing facility and headquarters.

History
The City of Duluth purchased the original property for the airport in 1929 from Saint Louis County. In 1930, the airfield was dedicated as Williamson–Johnson Municipal Airport.

In 1940, Northwest Airlines began the first regularly scheduled air service to Duluth. Two years later, operations were temporarily halted by World War II.

In 1942, three runways were paved. They were identified as runways 3–21, 9–27, and 13–31, respectively.

The original terminal building was built in 1954, south of Runway 9–27 and west of Runway 3–21. It would serve the airport for nearly 20 years.

In 1961, the Duluth Airport Authority Board renamed the facility Duluth International Airport.

In 1973, a new Terminal Building and U.S. Customs, International Arrivals Building, were completed east of Runway 13–31 and opened for operation. This resulted in Runway 13–31 being closed as a runway due to obstructions. In 1989, the newer terminal building and the adjacent structures were connected to form one enclosure. The original terminal building was then converted for use as offices for general aviation, the FAA, and the U.S. Weather Bureau. The 1973 terminal building had its last flight take place on January 13, 2013.

In 2013, a new passenger terminal was built directly in front of the 1973 terminal.  This new building solved several problems of the previous terminal building, including that the tails of parked airplanes extended too close to the runway due to FAA airspace changes made after the building's completion.  This terminal building has restrooms and concessions beyond the TSA security checkpoint, something the previous terminal lost when screening processes were put in place after 9/11.  The first flight to leave the new terminal was on January 14: United Express Flight 5292 to Chicago O'Hare.

On October 30, 2015, the new terminal was named for the late U.S. Representative Jim Oberstar, who represented the congressional district in which the airport lies from 1975 to 2011 and helped secure funding for the facility before its 2013 opening.

A 370-stall parking ramp with skywalk connection to the terminal was completed in fall 2014.

On May 23, 2019, American Airlines began twice-daily service to Chicago O'Hare International Airport. American ceased operations into Duluth in April 2020, citing lackluster demand.

In 2020, the airport received a $5,246,844 federal grant via the CARES Act.

Facilities and aircraft

For the year ending December 31, 2017, the airport had 64,053 aircraft operations, an average of 175 per day: 79% general aviation, 7% military, 13% air taxi and 2% scheduled commercial. In October 2018, there were 88 aircraft based at this airport: 49 single-engine, 10 multi-engine, 4 jet, 4 helicopter and 21 military.

Airlines and destinations

Ground transportation 
The Duluth Transit Authority operates two bus routes from the airport, including Route 8 on weekdays and Route 5 on weekends.

Statistics

Top destinations

Accidents
On May 31, 1954, a USAF Douglas C-47 crashed in a gravel pit in heavy fog at then Duluth-Williamson-Johnson Municipal Airport. Seven of the 14 occupants on board were killed.

See also
Minnesota Aviation Hall of Fame
List of airports in Minnesota
Duluth Transit Authority
Duluth Union Depot
Duluth Transportation Center
Northern Lights Express

References

External links

Duluth International Airport official website
 Aerial image as of 10 May 1991 from USGS The National Map
   at Minnesota DOT Airport Directory
 
 

Airports in Minnesota
Transportation in Duluth, Minnesota
Buildings and structures in Duluth, Minnesota
Airports established in 1930
1930 establishments in Minnesota
Duluth, Minnesota